Adab High School in Isfahan, Iran, was established in the early 20th century by British Anglican missionaries as an all-boys school. It was later converted to a secular school under the direction of Isa Sadiq (a man of letters and Minister of Education) and under the administration of Sayyid Yahya DowlatAbadi. Adab High School was the only all-boys high school in Isfahan with its own swimming pool and soccer field. At the time of its inception, Adab High School enjoyed modern physics and chemistry laboratories.

References 

High schools in Iran
Schools in Isfahan